Zond was the name given to two distinct series of Soviet robotic spacecraft launched between 1964 and 1970. The first series, based on the 3MV planetary probe, was intended to gather information about nearby planets.

The second series of test spacecraft was intended as a precursor to remote-controlled robotic circumlunar loop flights, using a stripped-down variant of Soyuz spacecraft, consisting of the service and descent modules, but lacking the orbital module.

Two tortoises and other lifeforms aboard Zond 5 were the first terrestrial organisms to travel around the Moon and return to Earth.

Missions based on the 3MV planetary probe

The first three missions were based on the model 3MV planetary probe, intended to explore Venus and Mars. After two failures, Zond 3 was sent on a test mission, becoming the second spacecraft to photograph the far side of the Moon (after Luna 3). It then continued out to the orbit of Mars in order to test telemetry and spacecraft systems.

Circumlunar missions

The missions Zond 4 through Zond 8 were test flights for the Soviet Moonshot during the Moon race. The Soyuz 7K-L1 (also mentioned just as L1) spacecraft was used for the Moon-aimed missions, stripped down to make it possible to launch around the Moon from the Earth. They were launched on the Proton rocket which was just powerful enough to send the Zond on a free return trajectory around the Moon without going into lunar orbit (the same kind of path flown by Apollo 13 in its emergency abort). With minor modification, Zond was capable of carrying two cosmonauts.

In the beginning, there were serious reliability problems with both the new Proton rocket and the similarly new Soyuz spacecraft, but the test flights pressed ahead with some glitches. The majority of test flights from 1967 to 1970 (Zond 4 to Zond 8) showed problems during re-entry.

The Zond spacecraft made only uncrewed automatic flights. Four of these suffered malfunctions that would have injured or killed any crew. Instrumentation flown on these missions gathered data on micrometeor flux, solar and cosmic rays, magnetic fields, radio emissions, and solar wind. Many photographs were taken and biological payloads were also flown.

Timetable

3MV planetary probe based missions
 Zond 1
 Launched 2 April 1964
 Communications lost 14 May 1964
 Venus flyby 14 July 1964
 Zond 2
 Launched 30 November 1964
 Communications lost May 1965
 Mars flyby 6 August 1965
 Zond 3
 Launched 18 July 1965
 Lunar Flyby 20 July 1965
 Communications lost 3 March 1966

Soyuz 7K-L1/L1S test missions
 Kosmos 146
 Launched 10 March 1967
 Prototype Soyuz 7K-L1P launched by Proton into planned highly elliptical Earth orbit.
 Kosmos 154
 Launched 8 April 1967
 Prototype Soyuz 7K-L1P launched by Proton and failed to go into a planned translunar trajectory.
 Zond 1967A
 Launched 28 September 1967
 Fell off course 60 seconds after launch. Escape tower took the Zond capsule safely away. The rocket crashed 65 km downrange.
 Attempted Lunar flyby
 Zond 1967B
 Launched 22 November 1967
 Second stage failure. The Zond capsule was safely recovered. The rocket crashed 300 km downrange.
 Attempted Lunar flyby
 Zond 4
 Launched 2 March 1968
 Study of remote regions of circumterrestrial space, development of new on-board systems and units of space stations.
 Returned to Earth 7 March 1968 – Self destruct system automatically blew up the capsule at 10 to 15 km altitude, 180–200 km off the African coast at Guinea.
 Zond 1968A
 Launched 23 April 1968
 Second stage failed 260 seconds after launch.
 Attempted Lunar flyby
 Zond 1968B (Zond 7K-L1 s/n 8L)
 Launched 21 July 1968
 Block D stage exploded on the pad, killing three people.
 Zond 5
 Launched 15 September 1968
 Circumlunar 18 September 1968
 Returned to Earth 21 September 1968
 A biological payload of two Russian tortoises, wine flies, meal worms, plants, seeds, bacteria, and other living matter was included in the flight and were the first Earth lifeforms to travel around the Moon and return safely.
 The first spacecraft to circle the Moon and return to land on Earth.
 Zond 6
 Launched 10 November 1968
 Circumlunar 14 November 1968
 Returned to Earth 17 November 1968
 Zond 1969A
 Launched 20 January 1969
 Stage two shut down 25 seconds early. Automatic flight abort. The capsule was safely recovered.
 Attempted Lunar flyby
 Zond L1S-1
 Launched 21 February 1969
 First stage failure. The capsule escape system fired 70 seconds after launch. The capsule was recovered.
 Attempted Lunar orbiter and N1 rocket test
 Zond L1S-2
 Launched 3 July 1969
 First stage failure. The Zond capsule was recovered.
 Attempted Lunar orbiter and N1 rocket test
 Zond 7
 Launched 7 August 1969
 Lunar flyby 11 August 1969
 Returned to Earth 14 August 1969
 Zond 8
 Launched 20 October 1970
 Lunar flyby 24 October 1970
 Returned to Earth 27 October 1970
 Zond 9
 Planned but cancelled. Planned for July 1969, carrying a crew of Pavel Popovich and Vitali Sevastyanov, but never flew.
 Zond 10
 Planned but cancelled

Photos

See also
 Zond failed missions

References

 Very detailed information about the Soyuz 7K-L1 used in Zond 4-8
 Radios in Zond spacecraft
 Exploring the Moon: the Zond Missions

 
Missions to the Moon
Soviet lunar program